Philotheou or Filotheou Monastery is an Eastern Orthodox monastery at the monastic state of Mount Athos in Greece. It stands on the north-eastern side of the peninsula.

History

It was founded by the Blessed Philotheus, in the end of the 10th century. The monastery ranks twelfth in the hierarchy of the Athonite monasteries.

By the end of the 15th century, according to the Russian pilgrim Isaiah, the monastery was Albanian.

In 1539-1540 the monastery was renovated with funds from the Georgian kings, Levan of Kakheti and his son Alexander II of Kakheti, frescos of whom are depicted in the refectory.

The library holds 250 manuscripts, and 2500 printed books (of which 500 are in Russian and Romanian).

The monastery contains 60 working monks.

References

External links

 Philotheou monastery at the Mount Athos website

Christian monasteries established in the 10th century
Monasteries on Mount Athos
Greek Orthodox monasteries
Byzantine monasteries in Greece